Porters may refer to:
 Porters, Virginia, an unincorporated community in Virginia, United States
 Porters, Wisconsin, an unincorporated community in Wisconsin, United States
 Porters Ski Area, a ski resort in New Zealand
 Porters (TV series), a British TV series

See also

Miss Porter's School, also known as Porter's, a school in Connecticut, United States
Porter (disambiguation)